Cell Transplantation is a monthly peer-reviewed medical journal covering regenerative medicine. It was established in 1992 and was originally published by Cognizant Communication Corporation until 2017, when it was acquired by SAGE Publications. The editors-in-chief are Paul R. Sanberg	(University of South Florida College of Medicine) and Shinn-Zong Lin (Tzu Chi University). According to the Journal Citation Reports, the journal has a 2017 impact factor of 2.885, ranking it 62nd out of 133 journals in the category "Medicine, Research & Experimental".

References

External links

Regenerative medicine journals
SAGE Publishing academic journals
Publications established in 1992
Monthly journals
English-language journals